Harnoli , is a town of Mianwali District in the Punjab province of Pakistan. The town is part of Piplan Tehsil and is administratively subdivided into two Union councils, one for the urban area and another for the rural area. It is situated in south of District Mianwali.

References

Populated places in Mianwali District
Union councils of Mianwali District